Esfurin-e Sofla (also Romanized as Esfūrīn-e Soflá; also known as Esfūrīn, Esfūrīn Chapī, Esfūrīn-e Chapī, and Esfūrīn-e Pā’īn) is a village in Qaleh Asgar Rural District, Lalehzar District, Bardsir County, Kerman Province, Iran. At the 2006 census, its population was 42, in 8 families.

References 

Populated places in Bardsir County